Sass de Stria is a mountain of the Veneto, Italy. It has an elevation of 2,477 meters. During the First World War, the mountain and surrounding area was the scene of fighting between Italy and Austria-Hungary.

Mountains of the Alps
Dolomites
Mountains of Veneto